Charlene Vanessa Edwards Honeywell (born November 19, 1957) is a United States district judge of the United States District Court for the Middle District of Florida.

Early life and education 

Born in Deerfield Beach, Florida, Honeywell graduated from Pompano Beach High School in 1975. She then graduated from Howard University in 1979 with a Bachelor of Arts degree in political science. Honeywell earned a Juris Doctor in December 1981 from the Fredric G. Levin College of Law at the University of Florida.

Professional career 

From 1982 until 1985, Honeywell served in the Tallahassee, Florida public defender's office, and then spent two years as an assistant public defender in the Tampa public defender's office. From November 1987 until June 1994, Honeywell served as an assistant city attorney for the City of Tampa and then spent six years at the Tampa law firm of Hill, Ward & Henderson, where she was a senior associate from 1995 until 1997 and then a partner from 1997 until December 2000.

State judicial service 

In 1994, Florida Governor Lawton Chiles appointed Honeywell to be county court judge in Florida's Thirteenth Judicial Circuit. She served from July 1, 1994 until December 31, 1994, but narrowly lost a bid for reelection in the fall of 1994 to attorney Frank Gomez.

In 1999, Honeywell applied for an opening on the Florida Circuit Courts, inspired in part by the appointment of Peggy Quince as the first African American female justice on the Florida Supreme Court. In 2000, Florida Governor Jeb Bush appointed Honeywell to a judicial post on the Thirteenth Circuit, which she held from January 2001 until becoming a federal judge in 2009.

Federal judicial service 

On June 25, 2009, President Barack Obama nominated Honeywell to fill the seat vacated by Susan C. Bucklew on the United States District Court for the Middle District of Florida. The United States Senate confirmed Honeywell's nomination by an 88–0 vote on November 9, 2009. Honeywell received her commission on November 12, 2009. She currently sits on the Tampa station of the court.

See also 
 List of African-American federal judges
 List of African-American jurists

References

External links

1957 births
Living people
African-American judges
Florida state court judges
Howard University alumni
Judges of the United States District Court for the Middle District of Florida
People from Deerfield Beach, Florida
Honeywell, Charlene Edwards
Public defenders
United States district court judges appointed by Barack Obama
21st-century American judges
Fredric G. Levin College of Law alumni
21st-century American women judges